Zobishchi is a rural locality (a village) in Oktyabrskoye Rural Settlement, Vyaznikovsky District, Vladimir Oblast, Russia. The population was 32 as of 2010.

Geography 
Zobishchi is located 15 km southwest of Vyazniki (the district's administrative centre) by road. Luknovo is the nearest rural locality.

References 

Rural localities in Vyaznikovsky District